Gvozdevo is a rural locality (a village) in Fominskoye Rural Settlement, Sheksninsky District, Vologda Oblast, Russia. The population was 29 as of 2002.

Geography 
Gvozdevo is located 53 km southeast of Sheksna (the district's administrative centre) by road. Aksyonovo is the nearest rural locality.

References 

Rural localities in Sheksninsky District